This is a list of National Basketball Association players whose last names begin with K.

The list also includes players from the American National Basketball League (NBL), the Basketball Association of America (BAA), and the original American Basketball Association (ABA). All of these leagues contributed to the formation of the present-day NBA.

Individuals who played in the NBL prior to its 1949 merger with the BAA are listed in italics, as they are not traditionally listed in the NBA's official player registers.

K

Mfiondu Kabengele
Whitey Kachan
George Kaftan
Ed Kalafat
Georgios Kalaitzakis
Chris Kaman
Frank Kaminsky
Enes Kanter
Ralph Kaplowitz
Jason Kapono
Tony Kappen
Sergey Karasev
Coby Karl
George Karl
Tony Kaseta
Ed Kasid
Mario Kasun
Leo Katkaveck
Bob Kauffman
Sasha Kaun
Wibs Kautz
Clarence Kea
Mike Kearns
Tommy Kearns
Adam Keefe
Harold Keeling
Trevor Keels
Billy Keller
Gary Keller
Jack Keller
Ken Keller
Rich Kelley
Clark Kellogg
Arvesta Kelly
Jerry Kelly
Ryan Kelly
Tom Kelly
Tony Kelly
Greg Kelser
Ben Kelso
Shawn Kemp
Tim Kempton
Frank Kendrick
Luke Kennard
Bill Kennedy
D. J. Kennedy
Goo Kennedy
Joe Kennedy
Larry Kenney
Larry Kenon
Bill Kenville
Jonathan Kerner
Johnny Kerr
Steve Kerr
Jack Kerris
Jerome Kersey
Tom Kerwin
Alec Kessler
Robert Kessler
Walker Kessler
Paul Kessy
Lari Ketner
Braxton Key
Julius Keye
Randolph Keys
Victor Khryapa
Jason Kidd
Stanton Kidd
Warren Kidd
Michael Kidd-Gilchrist
Irv Kiffin
Jack Kiley
Earnie Killum
Carl Kilpatrick
Sean Kilpatrick
Toby Kimball
Bo Kimble
Stan Kimbrough
Chad Kinch
Albert King
Bernard King
Chris King
Dan King
Dolly King
Frankie King
George King (b. 1928)
George King (b. 1994)
Gerard King
Jim King
Jimmy King
Leroy King
Louis King
Loyd King
Maurice King
Reggie King
Rich King
Ron King
Stacey King
Tom King
Willie King
Bob Kinney
Joe Kinney
Tarence Kinsey
Andrei Kirilenko
Alex Kirk
Walt Kirk
Wilbur Kirkland
Corey Kispert
Jim Kissane
Doug Kistler
Curtis Kitchen
Greg Kite
Bob Kitterman
Kerry Kittles
Maxi Kleber
Dick Klein
Joe Kleine
Linas Kleiza
Leo Klier
Louis Klotz
Duane Klueh
Lonnie Kluttz
Billy Knight
Bob Knight
Brandin Knight
Brandon Knight
Brevin Knight
Nathan Knight
Negele Knight
Ron Knight
Toby Knight
Travis Knight
Buzz Knoblauch
Lee Knorek
Dick Knostman
Rod Knowles
Kevin Knox
Bart Kofoed
Don Kojis
Eddie Kolar
Otto Kolar
Christian Koloko
Bill Komenich
Milo Komenich
Howie Komives
Jon Koncak
John Konchar
Tom Kondla
Bud Koper
Joe Kopicki
Furkan Korkmaz
Frank Kornet
Luke Kornet
Yaroslav Korolev
Hal Korovin
Kyle Korver
Tony Koski
Len Kosmalski
Andy Kostecka
Harold Kottman
John Kotz
Kosta Koufos
Tom Kozelko
Ronald Kozlicki
Vic Krafft
Arvid Kramer
Barry Kramer
Bob Kramer
Joel Kramer
Steve Kramer
Dan Kraus
Herb Krautblatt
Viacheslav Kravtsov
Jim Krebs
Vít Krejčí
Wayne Kreklow
Tommy Kron
Tom Kropp
Nenad Krstić
Joe Kruse
Larry Krystkowiak
Ray Krzoska
Steve Kuberski
Leo Kubiak
Vito Kubilus
Les Kuplic
Bruce Kuczenski
Frank Kudelka
John Kuester
Ray Kuka
Toni Kukoč
Arnoldas Kulboka
Jonathan Kuminga
Kevin Kunnert
Terry Kunze
Mitch Kupchak
C. J. Kupec
Rodions Kurucs
Rob Kurz
İbrahim Kutluay
Kyle Kuzma
Ognjen Kuzmić
Mindaugas Kuzminskas
Ed Kweller

References
  NBA & ABA Players with Last Names Starting with K @ basketball-reference.com
 NBL Players with Last Names Starting with K @ basketball-reference.com

K